Infanta Blanca of Spain (7 September 1868 – 25 October 1949) was the eldest child of Carlos, Duke of Madrid, Carlist claimant to the throne of Spain and his wife Princess Margherita of Bourbon-Parma. Blanca was a member of the House of Bourbon and - according to the Carlists - an Infanta of Spain by birth. In 1889 she married Archduke Leopold Salvator of Austria. The couple had ten children. The family left Austria after the end of the Monarchy and finally settled in Barcelona. When the male line of Blanca's family died out at the death of her uncle, Alfonso Carlos, Duke of San Jaime, some of the Carlists recognized her as the legitimate heiress to the Spanish throne.

Early life

Infanta Blanca of Spain was born in Graz, Styria, Austria-Hungary, the eldest child of Carlos, Duke of Madrid, the Carlist claimant to the throne of Spain under the name  Carlos VII and of his wife Princess Margherita of Bourbon-Parma. At the time of her birth, her parents were living in Styria in order to be close to her maternal great-grandmother, the Duchess of Berry. Her father left the same day for Paris where he learnt of the revolution that deposed Queen Isabella II of Spain. Don Carlos was joined in Paris by his wife and daughter and from there they moved to Switzerland.

Blanca's childhood was marked by the third Carlist War (1872–1876)  in which her father tried, unsuccessfully, to gain the throne of Spain by force. To be near the Spanish border Margherita moved with her children to Pau. For a time in 1875, Blanca lived in Elizondo, Navarre at the court established by her father. After the war ended badly, crushing Don Carlos' hopes of taking the throne of Spain, the family lived mostly in the Parisian district of Passy. In 1881 they were expelled from France due to Carlos's political activities. By then Blanca's parents had drifted apart. Her father went to live in his palace in Venice, while her mother retired to Tenuata Reale, an estate in Viareggio, Italy inherited in 1879 from Blanca's great-grandmother, Duchess Maria Teresa of Parma. Blanca and her siblings divided their time between their parents. In 1881 Blanca and her sisters entered the Sacre Coeur, a Catholic school run by nuns in Florence. Blanca played the mandolin and was very fond of horses. In 1883, upon finishing her schooling, she visited Spain incognito with her parents' permission. At her return she was officially introduced to the court in Vienna.

Marriage and issue

At the court of the Habsburgs, Blanca, the eldest and the best looking of four sisters, attracted the attention of Archduke Leopold Salvator of Austria, second child and eldest son of Archduke Karl Salvator of Austria and his wife Princess Maria Immaculata of Bourbon-Two Sicilies. They were married on 24 October 1889 at Schloss Frohsdorf in Lanzenkirchen, Lower Austria, Austria. The newlyweds settled in Lemberg, Galicia, then in Agram, Croatia and finally in Vienna, following Archduke Leopold Salvator's military appointments.

Blanca and Leopold Salvator's main residence was the Palais Toskana in Vienna. They also owned Schloss Wilhelminenberg and a rural estate near Viareggio, which Archduchess Blanca inherited from her mother. The marriage was happy and produced ten children:

Archduchess Dolores of Austria (5 May 1891 – 10 April 1974)
Archduchess Immaculata of Austria (9 September 1892 – 3 September 1971) ∞ 1932 Nobile Igino Neri-Serneri
Archduchess Margaretha of Austria (8 May 1894 – 21 January 1986) ∞ 1937 Francesco Maria Taliani de Marchio
Archduke Rainer of Austria (21 November 1895 – 25 May 1930)
Archduke Leopold of Austria (30 January 1897 – 14 March 1958) ∞ 1919–1931 (morg.) Baroness Dagmar von Nicolics-Podrinski ∞ 1932 (morg.) Alicia Gibson Coburn 
Archduchess Maria Antonia of Austria (13 July 1899 – 22 October 1977) ∞ 1924 Don Ramón de Orlandis y Villalonga (died 1936) ∞ 1942 Luis Perez Sucre 
Archduke Anton of Austria (20 March 1901 – 22 October 1987)∞ 1931–1954 Princess Ileana of Romania
Archduchess Assunta of Austria (10 August 1902 – 24 January 1993)∞ 1939–1950 Joseph Hopfinger
Archduke Franz Josef of Austria, Prince of Tuscany (4 February 1905 – 9 May 1975) ∞ 1937–1938 (morg.) Maria Aloisa Baumer ∞ 1962 (morg.) Maria Elena Seunig 
Archduke Karl Pius of Austria (4 December 1909 – 24 December 1953)∞ 1938–1950 Christa Satzger de Bálványos

Later life
Until World War I , Blanca and her large family had a pleasant uncomplicated existence moving according to the seasons among their various residences. During World War I her husband took on the provision of food for the Austrian Army in the front and was inspector general of Artillery until 1918. Blanca's two eldest sons also joined the Austrian army fighting in the Italian front, while her daughters Immaculata and Margaretha worked for the Austrian red cross. After the war and proclamation of the Republic, the properties of the imperial family were confiscated by the new Austrian government. Wilheminenberg was converted into a military hospital and then sold to a Swiss banker. With the loss of their wealth, they had to live in exile with meager means. The family could live neither in France nor in Italy, countries that had been Austria's enemies during the war.

Blanca was forced to ask her cousin Alfonso XIII of Spain, who belonged to the rival branch of the Spanish Bourbons, for permission to live in Barcelona. Alfonso XIII allowed them to come to Spain on the condition that they did not support the claims to the Spanish throne of Blanca's brother Jaime, Duke of Madrid. In 1922 Blanca was recognized as a Spaniard. The exiled family had to live modestly in a house in Barcelona. The fall of Alfonso XIII and the proclamation of the Second Spanish Republic in April 1931 did not directly affect their circumstances. However, five months later, Blanca's husband died during a trip to Austria while trying to recover some of their lost properties. Blanca was left under strained economical means, living from vineyards at La Tenuata Reale at Viareggio and from a small rent provided by the Carlist party of Catalonia. Three of her children were still living with her: Dolores, Margaretha and Karl. The convulsed political situation in Spain made them return to Austria.

The family was able to rent three rooms at their former residence in Vienna, the Palais Toskana. In March 1938 Hitler annexed Austria and Blanca with her children Dolores and Karl moved to her property in Viareggio.

Carloctavismo

In early 1935 a minoritarian branch of Carlism, the so-called “Cruzadistas” later to be named Carloctavistas, staged a grand meeting in Zaragoza; the gathering adopted a declaration that Doña Blanca was in position to transmit legitimate monarchical hereditary rights from her father, the Carlist king Carlos VII, to her sons. During the following 14 years her position on the issue kept changing and her stand falls into 4 different periods;

 in 1935, when Blanca’s paternal uncle and at the time the Carlist claimant to the throne Don Alfonso Carlos promptly disauthorised the Zaragoza gathering, she publicly distanced herself from the enterprise
 in May 1936, after Don Alfonso Carlos had decided to sort the succession issue by appointing a distant relative, Javier de Borbón-Parma, the future regent, Blanca issued a new statement; she declared that after the future death of her uncle, she would accept her hereditary rights to transmit them to her youngest son
 in 1940 she declared full loyalty to the regent Don Javier; the declaration did not amount to explicit renouncement of her hereditary claims, but implicitly suggested that they were at least parked or otherwise suspended
 in May 1943 she reverted to her 1936 stand and claimed first assuming and then transmitting heritage rights to her youngest son As he declared himself the legitimate Carlist heir a month later, Doña Blanca effectively supported his cause until her death.

She died, aged 81, in Viareggio, Tuscany, Italy.

Ancestry

Notes

References 
 Balansó, Juan. Las perlas de la corona. Plaza & Janés Editores SA, 1997, 
 McIntosh, David. The Unknown Habsburgs. Rosvall Royal Books, 2000,

Further reading
Lost Waltz A Story Of Exile by Bertita Harding (1944)

External links
 Lost Waltz A Story Of Exile by Bertita Harding (free Download)

1868 births
1949 deaths
House of Habsburg-Lorraine
Austrian princesses
Spanish infantas
People from Graz
House of Bourbon (Spain)